Dmytro Oleksandrovych Chumak (born 29 January 1980) is a Ukrainian épée fencer.

Career
Chumak won a bronze medal at the 2005 European Championships in Zalaegerszeg after being defeated 13–15 in the semi-finals by Poland's Tomasz Motyka. Along with Dmytro Karyuchenko, Maksym Khvorost and Bohdan Nikishyn, he earned the bronze medal in the épée team event of the 2006 World Fencing Championships after beating Hungary in the bronze medal match.

Chumak competed at the 2008 Beijing Olympics. In the first round he defeated Venezuela's Rubén Limardo, who would become Olympic champion at the 2012 London Olympics, but was stopped in the table of 16 by South Korea's Jung Jin-sun. In the team event, Ukraine lost in the quarter-finals to Poland and finished 7th after the qualification rounds.

Chumak also coaches at the Academy of Fencing Masters in Campbell, California.

References

External links
 
  (archive)
 
 

1980 births
Living people
Ukrainian male épée fencers
Fencers at the 2008 Summer Olympics
Olympic fencers of Ukraine
Universiade medalists in fencing
Place of birth missing (living people)
Universiade bronze medalists for Ukraine
Medalists at the 2005 Summer Universiade